Wichita North High School, known locally as North, is a public secondary school in Wichita, Kansas, United States. It is operated by Wichita USD 259 school district and serves students in grades 9 to 12.  The school was founded in 1929 on the site where the United States government previously sent Company 'A' of the 10th Division to the forks of the Arkansas River to protect the incoming cattle drivers from the Indians during the 1800s.

Wichita North is a member of the Kansas State High School Activities Association and offers a variety of sports programs.  Athletic teams compete in the 6A division and are known as the "Redhawks" (original name of "Redskins" retired in February 2021).

History
Wichita North High School was the second high school in the city of Wichita, completed in 1929. Wichita East High School was the first high school.

In February 2021, the Wichita Board of Education voted unanimously to retire the school’s mascot. A committee created by Wichita Public Schools to study the mascot determined: “the term is offensive to Native Americans and the Native American Culture.  The committee will not create a new mascot, but will adhere to BOE policy 1216, which states a school building principal is responsible for the development of school themes, songs, flags, etc. At this time, the North High administration has no plans to create a new mascot. The school will be referred to Wichita North High School and the school will continue to use their shield, drum and feather logo.  The school will have a 2-year phase-in plan starting in the 21-22 school year to remove the mascot name on athletic and fine arts uniforms, school apparel and signs. 

In November, 2022, the Kansas Board of Education voted for schools kindergarten through 12th grade to “retire Indian-themed mascots and branding." Following the vote, Wichita North High School students were allowed to vote on a new mascot. They had the following four choices to vote for: Wolfpack, Redhawks, North Stars and Red Storm. On December 14, 2022, the school changed its mascot name to the Redhawks.

Academics

Bio-Med
The Bio-Med Program is a four-year program that offers a core science curriculum as well as Project Lead the Way Biomedical Sciences elective courses. Students in the program are able to receive health industry certifications in areas such as EMT, EKG tech, Phlebotomy tech, CNA, CMA, and HHA.

AVID
The AVID (Advancement Via Individual Determination) program has been at North High for over a decade, helping students gain college and career readiness skills. In 2017 North High earned National Demonstration/Site of Distinction status.

Extracurricular activities

Athletics
The Redhawks compete in the Greater Wichita Athletic League and are classified as a 6A school, the largest classification in Kansas according to the KSHSAA. Throughout its history, Wichita North has won 22 state championships in various sports. Many graduates have gone on to participate in Division I, Division II, and Division III athletics.

State Championships

Track & Field, Boys 1970

Notable alumni

Class of 2014: Nico Hernandez, 2016 Olympic boxing bronze medalist, men's light flyweight division
Class of 2004: Elbert Mack, former Tampa Bay Buccaneers cornerback
Class of 1995: Tara Snyder, former Junior US Open tennis champion
Class of 1992: Craig Dingman, former Detroit Tigers pitcher
Class of 1991: Wendell Davis, former Dallas Cowboys cornerback
Class of 1989: Rolf Potts, travel writer and author
Class of 1988: Gaylon Nickerson, former professional basketball player
Class of 1987: Russ Campbell, former Pittsburgh Steelers tight end
Class of 1986: Barry Sanders, former Detroit Lions running back, 1988 Heisman Trophy winner, 2004 Pro Football Hall of Fame inductee
Class of 1986: Brad Holman, former Seattle Mariners pitcher and current Texas Rangers bullpen coach
Class of 1983: Brian Holman, former Seattle Mariners pitcher
Class of 1977: Lynette Woodard, 1984 Olympic basketball gold medalist, first female Globetrotter
Class of 1975: Carl Brewer, former mayor of Wichita
Class of 1975: Martha Davis, author and scholar of human rights and women's rights law
Class of 1970: Don Calhoun, former New England Patriots running back
Class of 1968: Paul Stovall, former NBA player. He attended school briefly and earned his diploma through correspondence 
Class of 1962: Riney Lochmann, former Dallas Chaparrals forward
Class of 1956: Curtis McClinton, former Kansas City Chiefs running back, scored first AFL touchdown in Super Bowl I
Class of 1956: Art Risser, naturalist and zoo scientist, former manager of the San Diego Zoo
Class of 1954: Judy Bell, first female President of US Golf Association
Class of 1953: Phil Ruffin, businessman and self-made billionaire
Class of 1952: John Dalley, violinist, Gaurneri Quartet between 1963 and 2009
Class of 1950: Robert Stephan, Kansas Attorney General from 1979 to 1995
Class of 1948: Vera Miles, actress who worked closely with Alfred Hitchcock; starred in movies like Psycho and The Wrong Man
Class of 1947: Kent Frizzell, former Kansas politician and U.S. assistant Attorney General
Class of 1946: Vern Miller, former lawman and Attorney General
Class of 1946: Ray Romero, former Philadelphia Eagles guard
Class of 1946: Barbara Sinatra, philanthropist, former model and showgirl, 2nd wife of Zeppo Marx, 4th wife of Frank Sinatra
Class of 1944: Vernon Smith, Nobel Memorial Prize winner in economics
Class of 1942: James Jabara, first American jet ace
Class of 1940: Richard Cowan, recipient of the Medal of Honor during World War II
Class of 1940: Les Layton, former New York Giants outfielder
Class of 1936: W. Eugene Smith, Life Magazine photojournalist
Class of 1935: Bob Thurman, former Kansas City Monarchs and Cincinnati Reds outfielder
Class of 1933: Don Enoch, former mayor of Wichita 1969-1970

See also

 Education in Kansas
 List of high schools in Kansas
 List of unified school districts in Kansas
 Native American mascot controversy
 Sports teams named Redskins

References

External links
 Official school website
Historical
 Historic photos of Wichita North High School
 Excerpts from A History of Wichita Public School Buildings, USD 259
 Historical 1928 Gym
Photos
 Photos of Wichita High School North 2006
Map
 Wichita School District - High School Boundary Map, valid starting fall 2012, USD 259
 Wichita School District - Boundary Map and Directory of Buildings, USD 259

Public high schools in Kansas
School buildings completed in 1929
Schools in Wichita, Kansas
1929 establishments in Kansas